Allocasuarina globosa is a shrub of the genus Allocasuarina native to the Goldfields-Esperance region of Western Australia.

It is found in clay, loam or lateritic soils.

The species was first described by the botanist Lawrence Alexander Sidney Johnson in 1989 in the work Casuarinaceae. Flora of Australia.

References

globosa
Rosids of Western Australia
Fagales of Australia
Plants described in 1989
Dioecious plants